Orientozeuzera rhabdota is a species of moth of the family Cossidae. It is found in Indonesia (Borneo, Sumatra, Java), the Philippines (Palawan), Thailand, Vietnam and Myanmar.

References

Moths described in 1932
Zeuzerinae